Laverack is a surname. Notable people with the surname include:

Edward Laverack (born 1994), Welsh cyclist
Frederick Laverack (1871–1928), British social worker, campaigner, and politician
Michael Laverack (1931–1993), British zoologist
William Laverack Jr., American businessman